This is a list of defunct department stores of the United States, from small-town one-unit stores to mega-chains, which have disappeared over the past 100 years.  Many closed, while others were sold or merged with other department stores.

Department stores merged with Federated and May 

Many United States department store chains and local department stores, some with long and proud histories, went out of business or lost their identities between 1986 and 2006 as the result of a complex series of corporate mergers and acquisitions that involved Federated Department Stores and The May Department Stores Company with many stores becoming units of Macy's, Inc. The following is a list of the affected stores, including some local and regional stores that earlier had been absorbed into chains that became part of Federated, May, or Macy's.

 Abraham & Straus (Macy's in 1995)
 D. M. Read (Macy's in 1990)
 Bamberger's (Macy's in 1986)
 The Bon Marché (Macy's in 2005)
 C.C. Anderson's Golden Rule (The Bon Marché in 1923)
 Bullock's (Macy's in 1996)
 Bullocks Wilshire
 Burdines (Macy's in 2005)
 Maas Brothers
 Carter Hawley Hale Stores (merged into Macy's West 1996)
 The Broadway (Southern California). Headquartered in Los Angeles.
 Emporium-Capwell (Northern California)
 Capwell's (East Bay)
 The Emporium (San Francisco and South Bay, North Bay)
 Hale Bros. (San Francisco and Sacramento)
 Weinstock's (Sacramento and Reno)
 Davison's (Macy's in 1986)
 The F & R Lazarus and Co. (Macy's in 2005)
 Shillito's
 Rike Kumler Co. (Rike's)
 William H. Block Co. (Blocks)
 Joseph Horne Co. (Horne's)
 Herpolsheimer's
 Famous-Barr (Macy's in 2006)
 The Famous Clothing Store
 Filene's (Macy's in 2006)
 Filene's Basement (separated from Filene's in 1988, closed in 2011)
 G. Fox & Co.
 B. Peck & Co. (sold to Gamble-Skogmo, Inc.)
 Steiger's
 Foley's (Macy's in 2006)
May-Daniels & Fisher
 The Denver Dry Goods Company
 Sanger-Harris

 Sanger Brothers
 
 Gold Circle (discount store chain) Founded in 1967 by Federated; merged into Richway in 1988 and later dismantled during 1990 bankruptcy
 Gold Triangle (discount store chain for electronics, appliances, home building supply, sporting goods, photography, housewares) Founded in 1970 - closed in 1981, 6 Florida locations - 3 Miami, Plantation, Tampa and Orlando.
 Goldwater's
 Goldsmith's Merged into Rich's in mid-1980s. (Macy's in 2005)
 Hecht's (Macy's in 2006)
 Castner Knott (Hecht's in 1998)
 Miller & Rhoads (Hecht's in 1990)
 Strawbridge's (Macy's in 2006)
 Thalhimers (Hecht's in 1990)
 Woodward & Lothrop
 I. Magnin, owned by Federated 1965-1988 and R.H. Macy Co. 1988–1994; most stores closed 1988–1993, remainder of stores converted to Macy's West and Bullock's or sold to Saks Fifth Avenue. Union Square, San Francisco location eventually incorporated into adjacent Macy's.
 John Wanamaker or Wanamaker's (Philadelphia and New York City flagship stores), sold to Carter Hawley Hale in 1979, then Washington, DC-based Woodward & Lothrop owned by Alfred Taubman; sold to May Company in 1995; merged with Federated Department Stores in 2005 (now known as Macy's, Inc.)
 The Jones Store (Macy's in 2006)
 Jordan Marsh  (Macy's in 1996)
 Kaufmann's (Offices merged with Filene's in 2002, Macy's in 2006)
 May Company Ohio
 O'Neil's (department store)
 Sibley's
 Strouss-Hirshberg
 L.S. Ayres (Macy's in 2006)
 Stewart's
 H. & S. Pogue Company
 Liberty House (Macy's in 2001)
 Marshall Field's (Macy's in 2006)
 Dayton's (Marshall Field's in 2001)
 Frederick & Nelson (defunct in 1992)
 The Crescent (department store) (defunct in 1992)
 Lipman's
 Halle Brothers Co.
 Hudson's (Marshall Field's in 2001)
 J.B. Ivey & Co.
 Meier & Frank (Macy's in 2006)
 Zions Cooperative Mercantile Institution (Meier & Frank in 2001)
 Rich's (Macy's in 2005)
 Robinsons-May (Macy's in 2006)
 May Company California (Robinsons-May in 1993)
 Hamburger's
 J. W. Robinson's (Robinsons-May in 1993)
 Steiger's (May in 1994)
 Stern's (Macy's in 2001)
 Gertz

Other department stores

Discount Stores
Ames. Bradlees was part of the Stop ‘n Shop Companies which was a grocery chain also based in Mass. While there were Bradlees discount stores in the mid Atlantic region, with a buying office on Broadway in the garment center district in NYC; the grocery stores were only in the New England area. Caldor, Service Merchandise, Venture, Woolco, and Zayre were national discount stores that closed due to changes in shopping places and patterns, and/or large debt from mergers and acquisitions.

National and regional 
 Acorn Stores (Minneapolis, Minnesota)
 Ames Department Stores Inc. (based in Rocky Hill, Connecticut)
 Arlan's Department Store (Mid-Atlantic and Midwest)
 Ayr-Way (Midwest/Great Lakes States-Based out of Indianapolis) Was discount chain of L.S. Ayres & Co. that eventually became Target Stores.
 L.S. Ayres (Indianapolis-Midwest/ Great Lakes states) Was eventually sold to May Department Stores and finally became Macy's.
 The Bon-Ton and its subsidiaries: Bergner's, Boston Store (Wisconsin), Carson's, Elder-Beerman, Herberger's and Younkers.
 Bradlees (based in Boston, Massachusetts) (New England, Mid-Atlantic)
 Britt's Department Store (national)
 E. J. Korvette (East Coast and Midwest) last stores were closed in 1980 after filing for bankruptcy
 Fisher's Big Wheel (Northeast & Midwest) Discount Department Stores based out of metro Pittsburgh, PA.
 Fred's (Southeast)
 F.W. Woolworth Company
 G. E. M. Membership Department Stores (national/Ontario, Canada; also known as G.E.X. and G.E.S.)
 Gibson's Discount Center, based in Texas but had spread to many other states at its peak
 W. T. Grant
 Hills Department Stores (National) Was bought out by Ames Department Stores.
 Howard Brothers Discount Stores
 Jack's (operated by Penn-Daniels and based in Quincy, Illinois with locations in Illinois, Iowa, and Missouri)
 Jamesway (Mid-Atlantic)
 S.H. Kress & Co., Puerto Rico subsidiary Tiendas Kress lives on, having survived parent company
 Leggett (Mid-Atlantic), acquired by Belk in 1997
 Lord & Taylor, the oldest department store chain in the United States, founded in 1826 in New York City, filed for Chapter 11 bankruptcy on August 2, 2020. On August 27, 2020, the company stated it would be liquidating all 38 locations by December 1, 2020.
 McCrory Stores (national)
 Mervyn's (primarily western U.S. but also in a few midwestern and southern U.S. states)
 Montgomery Ward (national - Chicago)
 Neisner's
 Odd Job Stores, Inc. (located in the northeast and midwestern U.S.), acquired by Amazing Savings in 2003 and went bankrupt in 2005
 P.N. Hirsch, acquired by International Shoe Company (later renamed Interco) in 1964; later sold to Dollar General in 1983 and rebranded
 Schultz's Family Stores, began as Schultz Bros. Co., headquartered in Lake Zurich, Illinois, 77 total stores in 1974 in the Upper Midwest, bankrupt and bought by Prange Way in 1989
 Sears Roebuck, still operating a few locations.
 Shoppers Fair
 Steve & Barry's
 Syms
 Topps stores were closed when parent company, Interstate Stores filed for bankruptcy in 1974
 Two Guys (Mid-Atlantic)
 Value City (Nationwide)
 Venture Stores (National) Based out of St Louis, MO metro area.
 Woolco, founded by the F.W. Woolworth Company as a full-line discount department store
 Zayre (New England, Mid-Atlantic, Chicago, Florida, Georgia)

Alabama 
 Gayfer's (Mobile)
 Loveman's (Birmingham)
 Mazer's (Birmingham) Opened in 1932, closed in 2011.
 Parisian (Birmingham), sold to Belk 2006, renamed September 2007. Five stores sold to The Bon-Ton, converted to the Carson Pirie Scott name.
 Pizitz (Birmingham), 13-store Alabama chain, sold to McRae's 1987, renamed later that year
 Rogers (Florence)  Became a division of Dunlap's that closed in 2007 after sale of store chain by Rogers family.

Alaska 
 Northern Commercial (Anchorage, Fairbanks, Kenai)

Arizona 
 Babbit's (Flagstaff)
 Broadway Southwest (Mesa)
 Diamond's (Phoenix, Tucson, Albuquerque, Denver and Las Vegas), was part of Dayton Hudson
 Goldwater's (Phoenix)
 Goldwyn's (Tucson)
 Levy's (Tucson)
 Myerson's White House (Tucson)
 Sacanni's (Tucson)
 Yellow Front Stores

Arkansas 
 MM Cohn (Little Rock), 2007

California 
 The Akron (Los Angeles), a Southern California-based "eclectic" department store chain that had specialized in carrying imported goods and unusual items such as parking meters and live Mexican monkeys, and which had stores as far north as San Francisco and far south as San Diego before it was forced to close its stores in 1985
 Blackstone's Department Store
 Blum's (San Jose), originally M. Blum & Co., established 1907; store appears to have closed shortly after death of owner and founder in 1940
 The Bon Marché (Le Sage Bros. Co.), 430–434 Broadway, opened in 1907, closed within a year
Boston Stores (California), HQ in Inglewood and later Carson; liquidated 1989
 The Broadway (Los Angeles), converted to Macy's
 Brock's (Bakersfield), started in 1924 and sold to Gottschalks in 1987
 Breuner's
 Buffum's
 Bullock's (Los Angeles), converted to Macy's
 Bullocks Wilshire (Los Angeles), converted to I. Magnin, then Macy's, and today it is Southwestern University School of Law.
 Butler Brothers (California)
 Carithers's (Petaluma), closed in 1986
 H.C. Capwell Co. (Oakland), merged with Emporium in 1929 to form the Emporium Capwell Co. holding company, Emporium-Capwell was acquired by Broadway-Hale Stores in 1970, Broadway-Hale Stores later became Carter Hawley Hale Stores and then Broadway Stores, Inc.; during this time, Capwell kept its name until 1979
 City of Paris Dry Goods Co. (San Francisco), became City of Paris by Liberty House. Demolished except the rotunda, now part of Neiman Marcus.
 City of Paris (Los Angeles), no relation to the San Francisco store or to Ville de Paris (Los Angeles), 1850s–1897
 Coulter's
 Crowley's (Vallejo)
 Daly's (Eureka), closed in 1995, with four Northern California stores, after operating for exactly 100 years
 Desmond's, founded 1862, became a large Southland-wide chain, closed 1970s
 Disco Department Stores (San Rafael), chain of discount stores located in Northern California and Northern Nevada, first store was opened in San Rafael in 1956 as Marin Associated Consumers by co-founder William L. Simmons, stores were later renamed MAC Disco Mart and then MAC Disco Discount Department Stores, chain sold to Daylin in 1966 and renamed Disco Discount Department Stores, first store outside of Northern California opened in Reno in 1968, stores were closed by 1975 due to financial problems with parent company
 B. H. Dyas
 Eastern-Columbia Department Store, Eastern Outfitters, Columbia Outfitters, San Francisco/Los Angeles through the 1950s
 Fedco
 FedMart
 Fedway (Los Angeles) – first store in this division opened (in Texas) in 1952 by Federated Department Stores;  Westwood store (first in California) opened in 1953; all stores closed and sold off in 1968
 Fifth Street Store: Walker's (Los Angeles, Long Beach, San Diego), main store in downtown Los Angeles was also known as the Fifth Street Store since it was located at the corner of Fifth and Broadway, main store was founded in 1905 as Steele, Faris, Walker Co., later became Muse, Faris, Walker Co., and then finally Walker Inc. in 1924; opened first branch store in Long Beach in the late 1920s; opened a branch store in San Diego in 1935; San Diego store separated in the early 1950s; opened second Long Beach store in 1954; closed Los Angeles store; sold Long Beach stores in 1960 and store renamed
 Frink's (Pasadena), founded by Jose and Lola Frink in the early twentieth century, but closed by mid-century
 Gemco
 Globe Department Store, South Broadway between 51st–52nd, South Los Angeles (1920s-1930s)
 Gottschalks, bankrupt March 31, 2009, which closed all of the stores. A few former Gottschalks stores were replaced as Macy's and Forever 21 in the Pacific region. There were plans to reopen stores in Auburn, Clovis and Oakhurst in spring 2011, but the deal ultimately fell through.
 GET (Government Employees Together) Lakeshore Plaza, San Francisco, discount chain, a membership retailer open only to employees of local, state, and federal government agencies. 
 Grodin's (San Francisco Bay Area), a 36-unit chain of men's and women's specialty stores, closed in January 1987.
 Gump's (San Francisco) closed 2018
 Haggarty's, Los Angeles-based chain of junior department stores for apparel, 1906–1970
 Hale's (Hale Brothers) (Sacramento/San Francisco), merged with Broadway in 1970 to form the Broadway-Hale holding company while keeping its name on its stores; merged into The Emporium under Carter, Hawley & Hale.
 A. Hamburger & Sons (Los Angeles), founded in 1881, purchased by May Co. 1923 and renamed May Company California 
 Harris Department Store, based in San Bernardino, absorbed by Gottschalks
 Harris & Frank
 Hart's Department Store (San Jose)
 Henshey's (Santa Monica), finally closed in 1992 after being in business since 1925
 Hilson's (Martinez), three locations closed 2001
 Hink's (Berkeley), also known as J.F. Hink & Son, closed in 1985
 Hinshaw's (Arcadia and Whittier), both stores were closed in 1992
 Kahn's (Oakland), founded by Israel Kahn in 1879, acquired by newly formed B. F. Schlesinger & Sons in 1925, B.F. Schlesinger & Sons was renamed Western Department Stores in 1941, Kahn was rebranded Rhodes in 1960
 S. Lazard & Co.
 Levee's (Vallejo), closed in the early 1980s
 Liberty House (became Macy's)
 H. Liebes (San Francisco), liquidated when its parent company, Beck Industries, filed for bankruptcy in 1970
 I. Magnin (San Francisco), converted to Macy's
 Joseph Magnin Co., closed 1984
 Marston's San Diego, 3 branches, purchased by The Broadway in the 1960s
 Mattei Bros. (Petaluma) – closed in 1995
 May Company (Los Angeles), merged with Robinsons and became Robinsons-May, then Macy's
 Mervyn's of California, operated stores in western US. Went bankrupt December 2008
 Milliron's, see Fifth Street Store, above
Nahas, 1953–early 1980s junior department stores with clothing and home goods, mostly in Los Angeles County. Purchased and absorbed independent department stores Rathbun's North Hollywood, Trenwiths Santa Barbara and Butler Bros. Van Nuys.
 F. C. Nash & Co. – Nash's (Pasadena), at one time had 5 stores in downtown locations in neighboring small cities during the 1950s and 1960s, founded in 1889 as a grocery store, became a department store in 1921, branch stores were unable to compete with larger chains opening in malls built in the late 1960s and early 1970s and had to be closed, main store destroyed in a daytime fire on May 11, 1976
 O'Connor, Moffat & Co., purchased by Macy's 1945, name changed to Macy's 1947
 Phelps-Terkel junior department store for apparel, founded 1923, survived in various forms until 1992
 Pic 'N' Save, became Big Lots
 Prager's (San Francisco), closed in 1921 after 25 years in business
 Rankin's, Downtown Santa Ana and Orangefair Center, Fullerton
 Rhodes (Sacramento and Central Valley), became Liberty House
 Robert's, based in Long Beach, which grew to nine stores before closing in the 1990s
 J.W. Robinson (Los Angeles), converted to Robinsons, then merged with May Company to become Robinsons-May, then eventually became Macy's
 Rosenberg's (Santa Rosa), located on Third Street; closed in 1998; now a Barnes & Noble
 Sage's Complete Shopping, one of the first full department stores that coined the name "super market," at Baseline and E Street in San Bernardino, later with stores in Riverside, Rialto, Colton and Redlands, confounded by Milton Ross Sage and C. C. Jenkins, 1937-1973
 Silverwoods
 Swelldom, junior department stores for apparel, Los Angeles, 1906–1970s
 Two Guys
 Unimart (Los Angeles, San Diego), locations variously became Two Guys, Gemco, FedMart; was owned by Food Giant Markets Inc until it merged in 1967 with Vornado, the owner of Two Guys, which quickly converted Unimart stores to Two Guys.
 Ville de Paris, Los Angeles 1893–1919
 Walker's, see Fifth Street Store (original Los Angeles store, from which Walker's Long Beach spun off) and Walker Scott (San Diego spinoff).
 Walker's (Long Beach)
 Walker Scott (San Diego), Solana Beach branch is now a HomeGoods store; founded as a branch of the Walker's Department Store of Los Angeles in 1935; close Walker associate George Scott became president in 1951 following death of Eliza Walker, widow of the deceased founder, in 1951; name of store changed to Walker-Scott in 1955; downtown store closed in 1984; all stores closed by 1986
 Webb's
 Weinstein's (1041 Market Street San Francisco), founded by Isidor Weinstein, went bankrupt in 1968
 Weinstock's (Sacramento), founded in 1874 as the One-Price Store by David Lubin and his half brother Harris Weinstein, renamed Mechanics' Store the following year, later renamed The Weinstock Lubin Company, acquired by Hale Bros. 1949, eventually acquired by Federated in 1995 via various mergers of its parent company, stores eventually rebranded Macy's
 White Front
 The White House (San Francisco), closed in 1965
 Whole Earth Access (Berkeley), last stores closed in 1998
Wineman's (HQ in Ventura, Oxnard, then Huntington Park)
 Zody's (Los Angeles), bankrupt and locations were sold to Ralphs Grocery Stores in 1986

Colorado 
 Broadway Southwest (Denver)
 The Denver Dry Goods Company, locations throughout the Front Range & Denver Metro
 Joslins (Denver), converted to Dillard's in 1998
 May D&F, with some of its stores purchased by Broadway Southwest
 Fashion Bar

Connecticut 
 Ames Department Stores Inc. (Rocky Hill)
 Arlan's Department Store (Waterbury)
Caldor (Norwalk) 
 The Edw. Malley Co., formerly the largest hometown department store in Downtown New Haven Store relocated during urban renewal in 1962 from Chapel Street to Church Street. Bankruptcy and closure, 1981.
 E.J. Korvettes (Downtown Hartford)
 Feinson's (Danbury), closed 2000
 G. Fox & Co. (Hartford), (Downtown Hartford) flagship closed and all branches merged into Filene's 1993, and most converted to Macy's 2006
 Grant's (central Connecticut, Stamford)
 Read's Department Stores (D.M. Read) (Bridgeport), merged into Jordan Marsh
 Shartenberg's Department Store (1915–1962), Downtown New Haven. Razed in 1964 as part of Mayor Richard C. Lee's redevelopment plans.
 Two Guys (Newington)
 Shoppers Fair

Delaware 
 Almart
 Bradlee's
 Hess's (Blue Hen Mall Dover, DE, and Seaford, DE)
 John Wanamaker or Wanamaker's (Wilmington and suburbs), sold to Carter Hawley Hale in 1979, then Washington, DC-based Woodward & Lothrop owned by Alfred Taubman; sold to May Company in 1995; merged with Federated Department Stores in 2005 (now known as Macy's, Inc.)
 Montgomery Ward
 Newark Department Store
 Strawbridge and Clothier
 Wilmington Dry Goods

District of Columbia 
 Garfinckel's
 Hecht's, converted to Macy's 2006
 Jelleff's
 S. Kann Sons Co.
 Lansburgh's
 Palais Royal, acquired by Woodward & Lothrop 1946
 Raleigh Haberdasher, operated originally as a haberdasher; expanded in later years to family fashions.  Acquired by Hartmarx Corp. before closing.
 Woodward & Lothrop, bankrupt and closed 1995 after briefly acquiring and operating John Wanamaker & Company (Philadelphia)

Florida 
 Brown's Department Stores (Dania Beach, Hollywood, Pompano Beach)
 Burdines (Miami), merged with Macy’s in 2005
 Cohen Brothers (Jacksonville), purchased by May in 1959; renamed May-Cohen
 Furchgott's (Jacksonville)
 Gold Triangle (Miami, Plantation, Tampa, Orlando) 
 Ivey's (Winter Park), purchased by Dillard's in 1990
 Jackson Byron's (later J. Byrons) (Miami)
 Jordan Marsh (Miami)
 J.M. Fields (Pompano Beach)
 Maas Brothers (Tampa), merged into Burdines in 1991
 Maison Blanche
 McRae's, sold to Belk in 2006
 Richard's, (Miami, Hollywood)
 Robinson's of Florida (St. Petersburg)
 Gayfers (Clearwater, Florida)
 Parisian, sold to Belk in 2007
 W. T. Grant  (discount, Jacksonville)
 Woolco (Jacksonville, South Daytona and other locations)
 Zayre (discount, Jacksonville and other locations)

Georgia 
 Chamberlin-Johnson-DuBose (Atlanta)
 Davison's (Atlanta), owned by Macy's since 1925 and converted to Macy's in 1986
 J.B. White (Augusta), became Dillard's in 1998 after J.B. White name was retired
 J. M. High Company (Atlanta)
 Kessler's (Atlanta), also locations in Rome, Newnan and Canton; low-end chain that closed in 1995
 Parisian acquired by Belk in 2007
 Rich's (Atlanta), acquired by Macy's
 Uptons (Atlanta), liquidated in 1999; regional chain similar to Kohl's

Hawaii 
 Liberty House (Honolulu)

Idaho 
 Block's Department Store (Idaho Falls and region) It was a Pocatello-based department store chain that had stores in Idaho and Utah and was liquidated in 1986. Not to be confused with the Indianapolis-based William H. Block Co. which was also known as "Block's".
 Idaho Department Store (southern Idaho) Caldwell-based department store chain that was purchased by the P.N. Hirsch division of Interco in 1966 when it had 25 stores and had survived at least to the mid-1980s. The chain was still a part of Interco when P.N. Hirsch was sold in 1983 but there is no mention of the chain in print after that point.
 King's Variety Store

Illinois 
 A. M. Rothschild & Co
 Ames
 Famous Department Store (Ottawa) closed in 1983
 The Fair (Chicago and suburbs), acquired by Montgomery Ward in 1958
 Gately's People's Store
 Goldblatt's (Chicago), some stores acquired by Ames Department Stores Inc.
 K's Merchandise Mart (Decatur)
 Lewis's (Champaign)
 Robeson's (Champaign)
 Henry C. Lytton & Co. (Chicago, with branch in Gary, Indiana)
Madigans
 MainStreet Chicago, acquired by Kohl's in 1988
 Marshall Field's (Chicago), acquired by Macy's September 2006 despite local protest
 McCabe's (Rock Island)
 McDade's
 Montgomery Ward, mail order store. Founded in 1872, Montgomery Ward pioneered mail-order catalog retailing and opened its first retail store in 1926. A bankruptcy reorganization in 1999 failed to turn the chain around. Closed 2001. Still exists as a catalog/internet/mail order retailer.
 Siegel-Cooper Company
 Chas A. Stevens (Chicago) Purchased by Hartmarx Corp. before being closed.
 Turn Style (Melrose Park), created by The Jewel Companies, Inc., sold to Venture Stores in 1978
 Venture Stores 
 Wieboldt's (Chicago)
 Zayre (Chicago)

Indiana 
 Aldens (Terre Haute)
 Ayr-Way (Indianapolis, statewide also surrounding states), originally a division of L. S. Ayres, subsequently acquired by Target
 L.S. Ayres (Indianapolis, 6 stores, and statewide)
 Ball Stores (Muncie)
 William H. Block Co. (Indianapolis, statewide), also was known as Block's
 Danner's Discount Department Stores (Indianapolis, statewide), several locations also known as 3D Discount
 DeJong's (Evansville) Purchased by Hartmarx Corp. and resold before being closed
 Fetla's (Valparaiso)
 The Giant Store (Anderson)
 Goldblatt's (South Bend)
 Gordon's (Gary)
 Heck's (Fort Wayne)
 Hills Department Store (Indianapolis)
 K&S Department Store (Kokomo)
 George H. Knollenberg Co. (Richmond), founded in 1866 by George Knollenberg, closed in 1995
 Meis (Terre Haute), founded in 1923 and was acquired by Elder-Beerman in 1987. At one time, it had 10 stores in three states with locations Terre Haute, Marion, Elkhart, and Kokomo in Indiana, Danville, Mattoon, and Carbondale in Illinois, and Paducah, Kentucky.
 Edward C. Minas Co. (Hammond), also had a branch store in Calumet City, Illinois at River Oaks Center
 Root Dry Goods Co. (Terre Haute) First opened in 1856 and operated until 1998 when it was sold to May Department Stores and converted to L.S. Ayres stores. Was owned by Mercantile Stores from 1914 to 1998.
 L. Strauss & Co. (Indianapolis)
 Schultz's Family Stores (statewide and Illinois)
 H. P. Wasson and Company (Indianapolis)
 Weiler's Banner-Fair Incorporated (Anderson, Portland and Hartford City)
 The Wicks Co. (Bloomington), operated between 1891 and 1976.
 Wolf & Dessauer (Fort Wayne, downtown and Southtown, and Huntington), purchased from City Store Company by L. S. Ayres (Indianapolis) in 1969 and rebranded as Ayres
 Zayre (Indianapolis)
 Ziesel's (Elkhart), founded in 1904 and closed in 1986

Iowa 
 Newman's (Cedar Rapids)
 Younkers

Kansas 
 ALCO Stores 
 Henry's (Wichita)
 Newman's (Arkansas City)
 Woolf Brothers (Wichita)

Kentucky 
 S.W. Anderson's (Owensboro)
 J. Bacon's & Sons "Bacon's" (Louisville), division of Mercantile Stores Company. All locations merged into sister division McAlpin's (Cincinnati) 1980s, select locations converted to Dillard's 1998 with Dillard purchase of Mercantile and the rest closed.
 Ben Snyder's (Louisville), was founded in 1913 and later sold to Hess's in 1987.
 Hess's (Louisville)
 Hub (Danville), opened 1906, renamed Hub-Frankel by 1948.  Closed in 1996.
 Kaufman-Straus (Louisville), changed to Kaufman's (1960), purchased from City Stores Company by L. S. Ayres (Indianapolis) in 1969 and rebranded as Ayres
 Mr. Wiggs
 Parson's (Ashland), furniture department continues to operate as standalone business circa 2009
 H. P. Selman & Co. or Selman's (Louisville), founded in 1915, purchased by Weiss Brothers (1961), name changed to Gus Mayer (1970)
 Stewart Dry Goods (Louisville and Lexington), division of Associated Dry Goods.  Merged into L. S. Ayres (Indianapolis) along with H & S Pogue Company (Cincinnati) in the early 1980s, then Macy's 2006.
 Wolfe-Wile Co. (Lexington)
 Shopper's Fair (Paducah) ?

Louisiana 
 Beall-Ladymon (Shreveport), purchased from Horace Ladymon by Stage Stores, Inc. in 1994. Stores converted to Stage soon thereafter.
 D. H. Holmes (New Orleans), purchased by Dillard's in 1989
 Krauss, 1903–1997
 Maison Blanche (New Orleans), last operated under that name by Mercantile Stores Co.  Remaining Maison Blanche stores converted to Dillard's in 1998.
 The Palace (Monroe)
 Palais Royal (Shreveport), purchased by Wellan's of Alexandria 1985. Rebranded and later closed. Stage later revived the name after their purchase of Wellan's.
 Selber Bros. (Shreveport), begun in 1907, purchased by and converted to Dillard's in 1988

Maine 
 Ames Department Store 
 Arlan's Department Store (Portland)
 Ben Franklin's (Bucksport)
 Bradlee's
 Britt's (Ellsworth)
 Grants Department Store (Bangor, Belfast, Biddeford, Calais, Old Town, Rockland, Portland, Brunswick)
 LS Hall Company Caribou, Maine
 Mammoth Mart (Bangor, Biddeford, Brunswick, Scarborough, Waterville), Ellsworth
 McLellan's (Waterville, Westbrook)
 J.J. Newberry (Lincoln, Millinocket, Calais, Eastport, Ellsworth, Brunswick, Norway)
 Porteous, Mitchell & Braun (Congress Street, Portland), branch locations in Auburn, Bangor, Brunswick, Presque Isle, South Portland, Newington, New Hampshire and Burlington, Vermont
 Freese's, Main St Bangor, Maine

Maryland 
 Bradleys (Dundalk, Baltimore)
 Garfinckel's (Washington, D.C., and Maryland suburbs)
 Hamburgers (Baltimore) Originally Isaac Hamburger & Son's clothiers
 Hechinger (Landover, Baltimore and Maryland suburbs)
 Hecht's (Washington, DC, Baltimore, and Maryland suburbs), converted to Macy's 2006
 Hochschild Kohn's (Baltimore and Maryland suburbs)
 Hutzler's  (Baltimore and Maryland suburbs)
 S. Klein (Beltway Plaza, Greenbelt) Lansburgh's (Rockville)
 Lazarus (Cumberland)
 Rosenbaum Brothers (Cumberland)
 Stewart's (Baltimore and Maryland suburbs)
 Sunny's Surplus (Baltimore, Dundalk, Elkridge, Towson)
 Woodward & Lothrop aka Woodies (Washington, D. C. and Maryland suburbs)

Massachusetts 
 AJ Wright (Framingham) Sold by TJX Companies, in 2010
 Almy's, closed 1985
 Ames, Southbridge, closed 2002
 Ann & Hope (Seekonk, North Dartmouth, Danvers and Watertown) closed in 2001
 Arlan's Department Store (New Bedford, Fall River, Massachusetts
 The Bon Marché (Lowell), later merged into Jordan Marsh
 Bradlees (Boston, Somerset, Massachusetts)
 Building #19, Swansea, Massachusetts, New Bedford, Massachusetts
 Denholm & McKay (Worcester), two branches at one time
 Filene's (Boston), converted to Macy's 2006
 Filene's Basement (Boston), separated from parent Filene's in 1988, closed 2011
 Forbes & Wallace (Springfield
 Gilchrist's (Boston)
 W. T. Grant, bankrupt in 1976, Fall River, Massachusetts, Somerset, Massachusetts
 J.M. Fields, Fall River, Massachusetts Chelmsford, Massachusetts
 Jordan Marsh (Boston), converted to Macy's in 1991 due to bankruptcy
 Kennedy’s of New England, Boston-based chain specializing in men & boy’s clothing; closed 1980
 King's Department Stores Inc. (Brockton)
 Lechmere, originally Lechmere Sales (Cambridge), closed 1997, Seekonk, Massachusetts
 Mammoth Mart (flagship store in Framingham)
 Raymond's Department Stores (Boston, also Dedham and other locations)
 Rich's (Salem, Greenfield and other locations), closed 1997
 Spag's (Shrewsbury), 1936–2004, sold to Building #19
 R. H. Stearns and Company (Boston)
 Service Merchandise
 Stuart's Department Store (Lowell)
 Zayre (Framingham), Fall River, Massachusetts
 Wilson's (Greenfield, Massachusetts)

Michigan 
 Arbaugh's of Lansing, also known as Cameron & Arbaugh.  See The Arbaugh.
 Arlan's Department Store (Detroit) though not opened in Detroit until 1960s expansion, founded in 1945, bankrupt in 1973
 Billings Five and Dime Store, Bay City, Michigan
 Ciechanowski`s Dry Goods. Hamtramck
 Crowley's, a/k/a Crowley Milner (Detroit), sold to Value City in 1999
 E.J. Korvette Korvette's Founded 1948, Bankrupt 1980
 The Fair (Lansing, Flint)
 Federal's (Detroit), discount department store, closed in 1980.
 Getz's Marquette, with over a 100-year history, still operating.
 Gilmore Brother's 1881-1999 Kalamazoo
 Grisdale's Department Store, Bay City, Michigan
 Grand Leader (Battle Creek)
 Herpolsheimer's (Grand Rapids, Muskegon), sold to Lazarus in 1988
 Himelhoch's (Detroit), filed for Chap. 11 in 1979.  Founded in Caro, MI in 1876, Himelhoch's moved to Detroit in 1907.  Himelhoch's Department Store returned online in 2018 under the ownership of fourth-generation family members.
 Hudson's (Detroit), rebranded to Marshall Field & Company in 2001, then Macy's in 2006
 Jacobson's founded in Jackson.  Independent regional luxury department store chain located primarily in Michigan and Florida, but also operated stores in Ohio, Indiana, Kentucky, and Kansas. The last store closed its doors in early 2002. Then, one store in Winter Park, Florida was re-established as Jacobson's in 2004.
 J.B. Perry, Port Huron
Kahn's Department Store, Mikado
 Kern's (Detroit), closed in 1959
KMart, originally headquartered in Troy, still operating a few locations.
Knapp’s (J.W. Knapp Company) closed in 1980
 Knepp's Department Store, Bay City, Michigan
 Kresge's and S. S. Kresge (Michigan) (incorporated in 1899), later K-Mart Corporation (headquartered in Troy), then Sears Holdings Corporation is frequently credited with invention of the modern discount department store with the opening of Kmart in 1962. The last Kresge's store in Livonia, Michigan closed in 1987. The chain operated over 2,000 stores worldwide.  Stores included lunch counters and fountain service as well as full department stores.  It also operated Jupiter stores which were a smaller-scale version of Kresge's and located in downmarket or declining commercial districts (the equivalent of a "dollar store" division of Kresge's). Jupiter stores, unlike Kresge and Kmart stores, sold 'factory seconds' merchandise.
 Lendzon's, Hamtramck 
 Mack & Co. (originally Mack & Schmid) located at Liberty and Main Street, Ann Arbor, in the building that eventually housed the later Pretzel Bell.  It was in business from the end of the 19th Century to 1940.
John H. Maurer Bargain Store, Cadillac
Mill End, Bay City and Clare
 Milliken's, Traverse City and Manistee, Michigan.  See William Milliken.
 Mitzelfeld's Department Store, Rochester
Montgomery Ward. Aaron Montgomery Ward, its founder grew up in Niles.  Various locations, including Dearborn, Jackson, Harper Woods, Lansing, Southfield, Southgate, Livonia Pontiac, Royal Oak Wyoming Ludington, Manistee, Port Huron, Roseville, Three Rivers.
Neisner's
Norman’s, Bay City, East Tawas, Standish, Traverse City
Peebles, Alpena
 Pizer's Variety Store Harrisville, originally The White Store, at the corner of Lake Street and Main Street.
 Robinson's, Battle Creek
 Sam's Cut Rate, Detroit
 Shoppers Fair
 Seitner’s Department Store, Saginaw
 Sears
 B. Siegel & Company, originally Heyns Bazaar.
 Smith Bridgman (Flint)
 Steketee's (Grand Rapids)
 Teerman's, Holland.
 The Fair Savings Bank Department Store, a/k/a The Fair Department Store Escanaba See Escanaba Central Historic District.
 Toeller's (Battle Creek), sold to L. W. Robinson Co. in 1971
 Topps (Redford Township), Telegraph & Schoolcraft; (Warren), 13 Mile & Van Dyke; all closed by 1974
 F.B. Watkins, Hopkins
The White store Lapeer
 Winkelman's (Detroit), purchased by Petrie Stores in 1983; closed during bankruptcy in 1998
Wonderland Discount Department Stores, Laporte and Michigan City, Indiana and Dowagiac, Niles and South Haven, Michigan
Woolworth
 W.T. Grant
 Wurtzburg's of Grand Rapids
 Yankee Stores, discount store with locations in Michigan and Ohio; closed in 1974
 Younkers Midland and Marquette. Owned by Bon-Ton Stores
 Zayre Kalamazoo

Minnesota 
 Dayton's (Minneapolis), est. 1902, converted to Marshall Field & Company in 2001, then Macy's 2006
 Donaldson's (Minneapolis), est. 1883, converted to Carson Pirie Scott in 1987 and closed in 1995
 Herberger's (St. Cloud)
 Powers Dry Goods (Minneapolis), est. 1881, acquired by Associated Dry Goods in 1920, merged with Donaldson's in 1985
 Salkin & Linoff (Minneapolis)
 Glass-Block (Duluth), founded as Panton & White
 Wahl's (Duluth)

Mississippi 
 McRae's (Jackson), acquired by Belk in 2006

Missouri 
 Famous-Barr (St. Louis), founded 1911, absorbed by May Department Stores early 1990s, acquired by Macy's 2006
 Heer's (Springfield), established in 1869, closed in 1995
 The Jones Store (Kansas City), absorbed by May Department Stores 1998, sold to Macy's chain 2006
 Kmart (St. Louis)
 Newman's (Joplin), acquired by parent company of Heer's of Springfield in the early 1980s, closed in 1995
 Scruggs Vandervoort & Barney (St. Louis), closed in 1967
 Stix, Baer, Fuller (St. Louis), acquired by Dillard's in 1983
 Townsend & Wall (St. Joseph)
 Venture Stores (St. Louis)
 Woolf Brothers (Kansas City), founded 1865, closed in 1992. (See Herbert M. Woolf.)

Montana 
 Buttrey's (Havre) (Miles City) (Wolf Point, Montana)
 Cole's (Billings)
 Hennessy's, acquired by Dillard's in 1998
 J.M. McDonald (Montana, Wyoming, others)

Nebraska 
 J.L. Brandeis and Sons Store (Omaha), acquired by Younkers in 1987
 Gold and Company (Lincoln), acquired by J.L. Brandeis and Sons Store in 1964. Building now Gold's Galleria office/retail complex.
 Herpolsheimer's (Lincoln), closed 1931.
 J.M. McDonald (Hastings), eventually grew to a chain of 82 stores, sold in 1968, liquidated shortly after 1982
 Miller & Paine (Lincoln and Grand Island), acquired by Dillard's in 1988
 Rudge & Guenzel (Lincoln), acquired by Allied Stores in 1929, closed in 1941 when Allied sold the contents of the store to Gold & Co.

Nevada 
 Ronzone's (Las Vegas et al.)

New Hampshire 
 Steinbach (Manchester, New Hampshire) Sold to The Bon-Ton

New Jersey 
 Great Eastern (aka Great Eastern Mills) Paramus, NJ, Little Falls NJ, Elmont NY and others.  merged with Diana Stores, then Daylin inc.
 Alexander's (Paramus)
 Bamberger's (Newark and other NJ locations), division of R.H. Macy, converted to Macy's in 1986
 Chase-Newark (Newark and 2 branches)
 J.M. Fields
 W. T. Grant
 Hahne and Company (Newark and statewide), New Jersey's carriage trade store merged into sister division Lord & Taylor
 Jamesway
 E. J. Korvette (North Brunswick Trenton)
 Kresge-Newark (Newark and 2 branches)
 Muir's Department Store
 Ohrbach's
 Reynolds Brothers (Lakewood)
 Steinbach (New Jersey locations)
 Two Guys (also known as Two Guys from Harrison)
 Yards Department Store (Trenton)

New Mexico

New York 
 Abraham & Straus (Brooklyn)
 J. N. Adam & Co. (Buffalo)
 The Addis Company, merged with Dey Brothers (Syracuse)
 Alexander's (New York metropolitan area), declared bankruptcy in 1992
 B. Altman and Company (New York City)
 AM&A's (Adam, Meldrum & Anderson Company, Buffalo), purchased by The Bon-Ton of York, Pennsylvania in 1994
 Arnold Constable (Fifth Avenue, New York City)
 Barker's (multiple locations)
 Bamberger's
 Barneys New York
 Beirs (Niagara Falls)
 L.L. Berger (Buffalo), last store, in downtown Buffalo, closed in 1991
 Best & Co. (New York), closed in the 1960s
 Bonwit Teller (New York City, Boston, and upstate New York)
 Britt's (Vestal) multiple locations including Gloversville/Johnstown 
 Caldor
 Century 21
 Chappell's (Syracuse), merged into The Bon-Ton of York, Pennsylvania in the 1990s
 De Pinna on Fifth Avenue, Manhattan
 Dey Brothers (Dey's, Syracuse)
 Family Bargain Centers (Binghamton, Norwich, South Corning)
 J.M. Fields
 B. Forman Co. (Rochester)
 Fowler, Dick & Walker - The Boston Store (Binghamton), now Boscov's
 Franklin Simon & Co.
 Georg Jensen Inc. (New York, NY) (Manhattan) 1935-1968
 Gertz Department Stores (Queens, Nassau and Suffolk counties), owned by Allied Stores; closed in 1982 and changed to Stern's then Macy's
 Gimbels (Manhattan). The rivalry of Macy's and Gimbels is immortalized in Miracle on 34th Street; Bernard Gimbel, the owner of Gimbels, along with Horace Saks founded Saks Fifth Avenue
 Gold Circle (multiple locations)
 Grand Way (Grand Union (supermarket))
 W. T. Grant (Binghamton, Troy, Long Island, Queens, and others)
 Hens and Kelly (Buffalo)
 Hess New Hartford, Rotterdam
 Hills Department Stores
 Jamesway (Oneonta), currently Price Chopper Plaza Rte 28. Also Johnstown
 Jenss (Buffalo), closed their last location on 15 September 2000
 Jupiter Stores, Division of the S.S. Kresge Company.
 Kobacker, two locations in Buffalo, New York; closure announced on December 27, 1972. No relation to Kobacker's Market, a grocery store in Brewster, New York
 E.J. Korvette (New York City), closed 1980
 Kresge's (multiple locations)
 Loehmann's, peaked at about 100 stores in 17 states, liquidated in 2014 after several bankruptcies.
 Lord & Taylor 1823-2020
 Luckey, Platt & Company Department Store (Poughkeepsie)
 Martin's (Brooklyn)
 J.W. Mays (Downstate New York), closed 1989, now leases old store locations
 McClean's (Binghamton)
 McCrory's (Johnson City, Amsterdam, Utica, others)
 G. C. Murphy
 John G. Myers (Albany)
 J.J. Newberry (multiple locations)
 Neisner's or Neisner Brothers was a chain of variety stores in North America, opened their first variety store in Rochester, New York, in 1911.
 Ohrbach's, liquidated in 1987 and acquired by Howland-Steinbach
 Pharmhouse
 Philadelphia Sales (Binghamton, Johnson City, Endicott)
 S. Klein (New York City), closed 1978
 Sattler's (Buffalo)
 Sibley's (Sibley, Lindsey, & Curr) (Rochester, in 1911, unit of Associated Dry Goods later merged into L.S. Ayers (Indianapolis) and then select locations converted to Lord & Taylor
 Siegel-Cooper Company
 Sisson's (Binghamton)
 A.T. Stewart's (Manhattan), purchased by Wanamaker's of Pennsylvania
 Times Square Stores, discount department chain mostly focused on Long Island
 Twin Fair, Inc. dba Twin Fair (multiple locations)
 Two Guys (multiple locations)
 John Wanamaker or Wanamaker's (New York City), sold to Carter Hawley Hale in 1979, then Washington, DC-based Woodward & Lothrop owned by Alfred Taubman; sold to May Company in 1995; merged with Federated Department Stores in 2005 (now known as Macy's, Inc.)
 Woolworth's multiple locations
 Zayre's (currently Wal-Mart, Miller Hill, Q) became Ames. Multiple locations

North Carolina 
 Brody's (Kinston), acquired by Proffitt's in 1998
 Ivey's (Charlotte), acquired by Dillard's in 1990
Sky City closed 1990

North Dakota 
 The Fair (Minot)

Ohio 
 Alms and Doepke (Cincinnati), Located furthest from central downtown Cincinnati relative to other department stores: N. side of Central Pkwy. between Walnut and Race Streets in an area bordering the "Over the Rhine" district; no branch stores. Closed and liquidated in 1955
 Best, closed in 1996
 Bargain City (Toledo), started by Hyman Swolsky in Toledo as Bargain Barn, later renamed Bargain City, sold to Gray Drug Co. of Cleveland in 1967, renamed Rink's Bargain City after merger, sold to Cook United Inc. and renamed Rink's in 1981, closed in 1987
 Bailey Brothers (Cleveland, Ohio) Later Bailey's Department Store, closed 1968.
 B.R. Baker, Toledo
 Buckeye Mart (Columbus, Ohio) owned by Gamble-Skogmo, Inc.; Columbus stores closed in the mid-1970s; Remaining Ohio stores along with Tempo stores in Michigan were sold to Fisher's Big Wheel Stores and renamed Fisher's Buckeye Tempo.
 Clark's (Portsmouth), owned by Clark's Gamble Corp., whose two shareholders were Landau Stores, Inc. and Gamble-Skogmo, Inc., Clark's Gamble Corp. was later sold to Cook United
 Cook's flagship of Cook United Corporation.
 Donenfeld's (Dayton)
 Federal's, (Cleveland, Ohio), branches of Federal Department Stores in Michigan not part of Federated Stores, this company closed in 1974
 Fisher's Big Wheel and Fisher's Buckeye-Tempo (Pittsburgh, Pennsylvania), Closed 1994
 Frank Brothers (Marion, Ohio), Closed 1979.
 Gaylords Department Store, Northeastern Ohio, Giant Tiger until 1968
 Gold Circle (Columbus, Ohio) part of the Federated Stores Company
 Goldman's (Dayton)
 Gregg's (Lima)
 Halle Brothers Co. (Cleveland), also known as "Halle's", division of Marshall Field & Company, sold 1981 to Associated Investors Corp,  Downtown closed 1982, Final Westgate Location in Fairview Park, Ohio closed in 1983
 Harts Stores a division of Big Bear Stores, Columbus, Ohio
 Heck's Department Store
 Higbee's (Cleveland), converted to Dillard's in 1992, now the Jack Cleveland Casino
 Hills Department Stores
  Milner's, Toledo
 J.J. Newberry.  This chain had many stores in Ohio including: Coshocton, Wooster, East Palestine, Cincinnati.  The company came under control of McCrory Stores in 1974. John Josiah Newberry, founder of the company, died in 1954.
 John J. Carroll (Newark).
 Jupiter Stores, Division of the S.S. Kresge Company. Operated several stores in Ohio. Including one in Downtown Mount Vernon, Ohio which had been a S. S. Kresge store for many years.  Also a location in Downtown Ashland, Ohio.  Jupiter was a no frills store. When leases were soon to be up on several S. S. Kresge stores the Jupiter format was put in place.  All remaining Kresge and Jupiter stores were sold to McCrory in 1987 with the Canadian Kresge and Jupiter stores closing in 1994.
 Kobackers (Canton, Mansfield, Portsmouth), purchase by Davidson Bros., the parent of Federal's in 1961
 Lamson Brothers (Toledo).  Lamson's entered bankruptcy and closed in 1976.  
 Lasalle & Koch Co. (Toledo), bought by R.H. Macy in 1923; operated under the Lasalle's name until 1981, when Macy consolidated Lasalle's with another division, Macy's Missouri-Kansas, to form Macy's Midwest.  Macy sold the former Lasalle's stores to Elder-Beerman of Dayton in 1985.
 Lazarus (Columbus), a founding division of Federated Stores, name change briefly to Lazarus-Macy's and then Macy's in 2005.
 Leader Store (Lima), converted to Elder-Beerman, still operating as of 2009
 The Lion Dry Goods Co. (Toledo), known locally as the Lion Store.  Some locations survive as of 2009 with the Dillard's name, following their 1998 purchase of Lion's previous owner, Mercantile Stores Co.
 Mabley & Carew (Cincinnati), unit of Allied Department Stores
 May Company (Cleveland), merged into Kaufmann's in 1993 and converted to Macy's 2006
 McAlpin's (Cincinnati), unit of Mercantile Stores Co., select locations operating as Dillard's as of 2009
 Morehouse Martens (Columbus, Ohio), merged with "The Fashion" to become "Morehouse-Fashion," later shortened to "The Fashion"; closed by Allied Stores in 1969
 Mr. Wiggs Sandusky based chain that had stores in Ohio, Kentucky, and Indiana, started in Mentor as Bargain Fair in 1956, gradually rebranded stores Mr. Wiggs by 1967
 Murphy's Mart
 Neisner's  (Lakewood, Ohio) & Warren Village Shopping Center Cleveland, Ohio. Warren Village store burned in 1972, Lakewood store closed in 1978.
 O'Neil's Department Store (Akron), merged into May Company Cleveland, in 1989 & then Kaufmann's in 1993, converted to Macy's in 2006
 Ontario's (Columbus) part of Cook United.
 H. & S. Pogue Company (Cincinnati), division of Associated Dry Goods.  Merged into sister division L.S. Ayres (Indianapolis) in the early 1980s, which was converted to Macy's in 2006.
 Polsky's (Akron), purchased by Allied Stores in 1955 and closed in 1978
 Rattenberg's, (Utica).
 Rike Kumler Co. (Dayton), division of Federated Department Stores.  Briefly merged into sister division John Shillito Company (Cincinnati) in the early 1980s as Shillito-Rike's.
 Rink's Founded by Hyman Ullner in Hamilton in 1951; acquired by Gray Drug Co. of Cleveland in 1964; Bargain City acquired by Gray Drug in 1967; both chains sold to Cook United in 1981; closed in 1987.
 Rollman's (Cincinnati) Downtown store location—N.W. corner of 5th and Vine Streets—was taken over by Mabley & Carew after primary and branch Rollman's stores were liquidated in the early 1960s
 Rudin's (Mount Vernon), sold to Uhlman's in 1979
 John Shillito Company (Cincinnati), division of Federated Department Stores.  Briefly merged into sister division Rike-Kumler Company (Dayton) in the early 1980s as Shillito-Rike's, and then with sister division F&R Lazarus (Columbus). Select locations converted to Macy's 2006.
  Stein's, Toledo
 Sterling-Lindner-Davis (Cleveland), closed September, 1968; was a part of Allied Stores
 Stern and Mann (Canton), opened in 1887, close by the early 1990s
 Strouss (Youngstown), division of May Department Stores, merged into May's Kaufmann's (Pittsburgh) division, converted to Macy's 2006
 Swallen's (Cincinnati, Ohio), bankrupt in 1995
 The Fashion (store) (Columbus, Ohio), purchased by Allied Stores in 1949; later merged with Morehouse Martens to form "Morehouse Fashion"; Later returned to The Fashion
 William Taylor & Son (Cleveland), also known at Taylor's, acquired by May Company in 1939, closed in December, 1961. Southgate branch changed to May Company
 Tiedtke's (Toledo)
 Uhler's  (Marion, Ohio) Founded as the Uhler Phillips Company.  James Phillips left the company following the scandal that linked his wife Carrie Phillips with President Warren G. Harding.
 Uhlman's (Bowling Green), also known as F.W. Uhlman in Ohio, Illinois, Indiana and Michigan, purchased by Stage Stores Inc. in 1996
 Uncle Bill's, a northeast Ohio chain that was part of Cook United stores.
 Union Company (Columbus), purchased by Marshall Fields in 1980 and converted to Halle Brothers which was also owned by Marshall Fields
 Valley View (Brookfield), operated 1959–1995.
 Value City Sold by Schottenstein holdings of Columbus, re-branded as Halle's in 1980 and closed in 1983
 Van Leunen's  (Cincinnati), closed in 1994 when parent company decided to focus on sporting goods
 Edward Wren Co. (Springfield), also was known as Wren's, sold to Allied Stores in 1952, merged with & rebranded as William H. Block Co. (Indianapolis) in 1984, closed 1987
 Zayre was a chain of discount stores that operated in the eastern half of the United States from 1956 to 1990, later sold to Ames (store)
 Ziegler's (Medina), opened in 1904, closed in 1992

Oklahoma 
 John A. Brown (Oklahoma City), was part of Dayton Hudson; absorbed by Dillard's

Oregon 
 Lipman's (was part of Dayton Hudson)
 Olds, Wortman & King (Portland)
 Emporium (also known as Troutman's Emporium)
 Meier & Frank
G.I. Joe's

Pennsylvania 
 Ames
 Bamberger's (Newark and other NJ locations), division of R.H. Macy, most former locations switched to Macy's in 1986
 BEST
 Big N (1960s)
 Bloom Brothers Department Stores (Chambersburg, Waynesboro, Dry Run, and Burnt Cabins; also Baltimore, Maryland), 1897–1944
 Boston Store (Erie)
 Bradlees
 Britt's Department Store (Allentown)
 Caldor
 Cox's (McKeesport), 1955–1983
 E. J. Korvette (Philadelphia area)
 Fisher's Big Wheel, closed in 1994
 Fowler, Dick & Walker, The Boston Store (downtown Wilkes-Barre), converted to Boscov's
 Frank & Seder (Pittsburgh)
 GC Murphy Co. (Pittsburgh & suburbs)
 Gee Bee Department Stores
 Gimbels (Philadelphia, Downtown Pittsburgh and suburbs)
 The Globe Store (Scranton), closed in 1994
 Glosser Brothers
 Gold Circle
 (W.T.) Grant's Department Store (Sayre)
 Hess's (Allentown), closed in 1996
 Hills Department Stores
 Horne's (Pittsburgh), closed in 1994
 Jamesway
 J.M. Fields
 John Wanamaker or Wanamaker's (Philadelphia), sold to Carter Hawley Hale in 1979, then Washington, DC-based Woodward & Lothrop owned by Alfred Taubman; sold to May Company (Hecht's) in 1995; merged with Federated Department Stores in 2005 (now known as Macy's, Inc.)
 Kaufman's (Uniontown) 
 Kaufmann's (Pittsburgh), converted to Macy's 2006
 S. Klein (Broomall)
 Kresge's (Pittsburgh and Suburbs) (S.S. Kresge was also the founder of K-Mart Stores)
 S. H. Kress & Co. (Nanticoke)
 Laneco (Easton)
 Lazarus (Downtown Pittsburgh and suburbs) - now Macy's
 Leh's (Allentown area), closed in 1994
 Lit Brothers (Philadelphia), closed in 1977
 LL Stearns Williamsport, Pennsylvania
 McCrory
 Montgomery Ward
 Murphy's Mart (Pittsburgh and Suburbs)
 J.J. Newberry (multiple locations)
 Orr's (Bethlehem, Easton), closed in 1993
 Penn Traffic
 Service Merchandise
 Snellenburg's (Philadelphia area), 1869-1962
 Strawbridge & Clothier (Philadelphia), converted to Macy's 2006
 Towers (Pittsburgh and suburbs)
 Trader Horn (Butler)
 Two Guys Department Store
 The Bon-Ton Department Store (Based in York, Pa.)
 Watt & Shand (Lancaster), sold to The Bon-Ton
 Woolworth's (Pittsburgh and suburbs)
 Zayre (Pittsburgh & suburbs)

Rhode Island 
 Apex Stores (flagship in Pawtucket)
 The Outlet Company (Providence)
 The Shepard Co. (Providence)
 Benny's, a discount store based in Smithfield that had locations in Rhode Island, Connecticut, and Massachusetts. All locations closed in December 2017.
Ann & Hope (Cumberland) Downgraded in 2001 closed all outlet stores in 2020.
South Carolina

J.B. White

South Dakota 
 Fantle's

Tennessee 
 Bry's (Memphis), sold to the parent company of Lowenstein's in 1956 before going out of business
 Cain-Sloan (Nashville), absorbed by Dillard's
 Castner Knott (Nashville), division of Mercantile Stores Company
 Fazio's 
 Gerber's (Memphis), closed in 1975
 Goldsmith's (Memphis), Merged into Rich's, later converted to Macy's
 Harvey's (Nashville)
 Julius Lewis (Memphis)
 Loveman's (Chattanooga), acquired by Proffitt's in 1986
 Miller's of Tennessee (Knoxville), sold to Hess's in 1987
 Parisian acquired by Belk in 2007
 Proffitt's (Alcoa), converted to Belk stores in 2006

Texas 
 Barker's (San Antonio)
 Cox's (Waco), closed in 1995
 Dunlaps (Lubbock and many other West Texas/New Mexico locations), closed in 2007
 The Fair (Galveston)
 Fedway (Wichita Falls, Longview, Amarillo, Midland, Corpus Christi), a division of Federated Department Stores that had existed in Texas from 1952 to 1968 in which stores were opened in expanding post-World War II markets of Texas and later the rest of the Southwest that were traditionally under served by existing chains; the first store opening in Wichita Falls in 1952; after expanding throughout Texas, chain expanded into New Mexico, Oklahoma, and California
 Foley's (Foley Brothers) (Houston), division of May Company, converted to Macy's in 2006
 Frost Bros. (San Antonio)
 Gemco (Houston)
 Joske's (San Antonio, also Houston and Dallas), acquired by Dillard's in 1987
 Mitchell's (Fort Worth)
My Shoes (San Antonio, 1988, Tagline "Put Yourself in My Shoes")
 The Popular (El Paso)
 Sakowitz (Houston)
 Sanger-Harris (Dallas), division of Federated Department Stores, merged into sister division Foley's (Houston) in 1987, converted to Macy's in 2006
 Sanger Brothers (Dallas)
 Stripling & Cox (Fort Worth)
 Cox's (Fort Worth) merged with W.C. Stripling & Sons
 W.C. Stripling & Sons (Fort Worth), merged with Cox's
 Titche-Goettinger (Dallas area), merged with Joske's in 1979

Utah 
 Mervyns (the chain may come back, by the Morris decisions)
 Fred Meyer
 Grand Central Stores, acquired by Fred Meyer 1985, acquired 1999 by Kroger in a merger and operations assumed by Smith's Food and Drug Stores (now a separate division of Kroger and converted into Smith's Marketplace)
 ZCMI (Zions Cooperative Mercantile Institution), founded and operated by the LDS Church until purchased by May Company (1999), became Meier and Frank in 2003, some stores sold to Dillard's, others became Macy's in 2005

Vermont 
 Britts Department Store (Springfield)
 Grand Way (South Burlington)

Virginia 
 Bradlees
 BEST
 GC Murphy Co.
 Hechts (bought by The May Department Stores Company in 1959, took over Thalhimer's and Miller & Rhoads in 1990, bought by Federated Department Stores in 2005 and spun off into Macy's East and Macy's South in 2006)
 S.H. Heironimus (Roanoke)
 J.M. Fields
 Miller & Rhoads (Richmond)
 Rices Nachmans, formerly the Rices and Nachmans chains (Norfolk/Hampton Roads metro area)
 Robert Hall Village
 Thalhimers (Richmond)

Washington 
 The Crescent (Spokane), a division of B.A.T.U.S
 Frederick & Nelson (Seattle), division of Marshall Field & Company (Chicago)
 Lamonts
 Peoples (Tacoma), 7-store chain in the Puget Sound region, owned by Mercantile Stores Co.; closed in 1983
 Rhodes Brothers (Tacoma), renamed Liberty House in 1974
 Valu-Mart (Seattle), renamed Leslie's in 1974, acquired by Fred Meyer in 1976
 Wigwam Stores Inc. (based in Seattle)
 White Front (Burien, Tacoma, Shoreline, Bellevue, Everett), 1969 to 1972

West Virginia 
 Ames various locations
 The Diamond (Charleston and Vienna)
 Gee Bee  Part of Glosser Brothers of Ohio.
 Heck's Department Store, shuttered in the early 1990s
 Hills
 L.A. Joe Department Store
 G. C. Murphy
 Stone & Thomas, West Virginia's biggest department store chain; bought by Elder-Beerman in 1998
 Watson's

Wisconsin 
 T.A. Chapman Co. (Milwaukee)
 Copps Department Store (Stevens Point), their department stores closed 1984, when Copps decided to shift their focus over to their supermarkets.
 Gimbels (Milwaukee), converted to Marshall Field's then one former Gimbels location (Madison) to Macy's 2006.
 Hoff Department Store (Mount Horeb) closed 1984
 H.C. Prange Co. (Sheboygan), sold to Younkers in 1992
 Prange Way (De Pere), spun off in 1990 by H.C. Prange Co.; closed 1996
 Schuster's (Milwaukee), bought by Gimbels in 1962
 Shopko (Green Bay), June 2019
 Roth Brothers (Superior), founded pre-1900 as the "Bee Hive Bazaar."

See also 
 List of department stores by country
 List of department stores of the United States
 List of defunct retailers of the United States

References

External links

 Stuart A. Rose Manuscript, Archives, and Rare Book Library, Emory University: Muse's Department Store (Atlanta, Ga.) records

 
Department stores of the United States, defunct
Department stores